The Century Theatre, originally the New Theatre, was a theatre at 62nd Street and Central Park West on the Upper West Side of Manhattan in New York City. Opened on November 6, 1909, it was noted for its fine architecture but due to poor acoustics and an inconvenient location it was financially unsuccessful. The theatre was demolished in 1930 and replaced by The Century apartment building.

History

New Theatre

The New Theatre was once called "New York's most spectacularly unsuccessful theater" in the WPA Guide to New York City. Envisioned in 1906 by Heinrich Conried, a director of the Metropolitan Opera House, its construction was an attempt to establish a great theatre at New York free of commercialism, one that, broadly speaking, would resemble the Comédie Française of Paris. Thirty founders each subscribed $35,000 at the start, and a building designed to be the permanent home of a repertory company was constructed on Central Park West on the Upper West Side at a cost of three million dollars. Architecturally, it was one of the handsomest structures in the city, designed by the prominent Beaux-Arts architectural firm Carrère and Hastings.

With Winthrop Ames as the only director, the New Theatre Company occupied the building for only two seasons, 1909–10 and 1910–11. Capable of seating 2,300 persons, the New Theatre was opened on Saturday, November 6, 1909, with impressive ceremonies and apparently under the most favoring auspices, but a serious defect in the acoustics became apparent at once and this was only partly remedied by the installation of a sound-deflecting bell. The world premiere of Sergei Rachmaninoff's 3rd piano concerto took place on Sunday, November 28, 1909, at the New Theatre, with Rachmaninoff as soloist and Walter Damrosch conducting the New York Symphony Society.  Several Shakespearean plays were given, by far the most notable presentation being that of The Winter's Tale.  On the whole the company did its best ensemble work in some of the modern plays of that time, like Maeterlinck's The Blue Bird and Sister Beatrice, Galsworthy's Strife, and Edward Sheldon's The Nigger starring Annie Russell.  A poetic drama of distinction was Josephine Preston Peabody's The Piper. In most cases the stage settings were of very high quality.

The building was located a mile above the Theater District, and it was exceedingly expensive to maintain. Financially, the venture proved to be a boondoggle. At the end of the second season, the founders of the company decided to abandon the theatre and lease it out. Plans were made to construct a smaller building in the theatre district, but it was found to be impracticable and the company folded.<ref>"The New Theatre", The New York Times, December 22, 1911.</ref> The theatre critic William Winter wrote:

Century Theatre
In 1911, the building was leased to other theatre managers, who changed the name to the Century Theatre, the Century Opera House (1913), and the Century once more (1915), with Florenz Ziegfeld as manager.

From Europe in 1912 came Judith Gautier and Pierre Loti, producers and supervisors of The Daughter of Heaven. Despite their efforts, the critic of The New York Times found the play "rich in spectacle, but dramatically deficient", and the scene changes tedious and "long delayed".

In 1917, producers Florenz Ziegfeld and Charles Dillingham opened the roof garden as a nightclub and named it the Cocoanut Grove, based on the success of a similar venue, Ziegfeld Midnight Frolic at the New Amsterdam Theatre. The "Shrine of Snobbism", as the WPA Guide called it, was demolished in 1930. The next year, the Art Deco Century Apartments (designed and developed by the office of Irwin S. Chanin) was completed on the Century Theatre's site.

Gallery

References

 
 The New Theatre (New York, 1909), which gives the names of founders, officers, etc., with biographical sketches and portraits of the company
 The New Theatre, Season 1909–10'' (New York, 1910), for titles of plays, dates of production, casts, etc.

External links
 

New Theatre costume designs, 1909-1911, held by the Billy Rose Theatre Division, New York Public Library for the Performing Arts

1909 establishments in New York City
1931 disestablishments in New York (state)
Beaux-Arts architecture in New York City
Buildings and structures demolished in 1931
Carrère and Hastings buildings
Demolished buildings and structures in Manhattan
Demolished theatres in New York City
Former theatres in Manhattan
Metropolitan Opera
Opera houses in New York City
Theatres completed in 1909
Upper West Side